Kızıl Kilise, the Red Church, also known as Sivrihisar Kızıl Kilise to distinguish it from other structures called Kızıl Kilise, is a partially ruined sixth-century church in the Güzelyurt district of Aksaray Province, Turkey. The church takes its name from the red stone used to build it. The building has been listed in the World Monuments Watch since 2008.

Background
Probably erected in the sixth century during the reign of the Byzantine Emperor Justinian I (r. 527–565), the edifice is one of the oldest Christian shrines of the Cappadocia region and one of the oldest churches known to have a cupola on a drum with windows that illuminate the interior.
The church was possibly dedicated to Saint Gregory of Nazianzus, one of the fathers of the Cappadocian church. According to some sources the natives called it Saint Panteleimon Monastery (Μοναστήριον του Αγίου Παντελεήμονος). Though this conflicts with existing claims of its name being Saint Spyridon.

In central and eastern Cappadocia, 5th and 6th-century churches with cross-shaped plans were standard. Kızıl Kilise follows this plan form, using local volcanic stones cut into regular blocks by highly skilled workers. Architecturally, the most characteristic element of the church is its central dome, erected above an octagonal drum. Eight windows pierce the drum, flooding the nave with light. The only later addition to the building is the narthex; otherwise the church, albeit damaged, still retains its original form. The presence of huge lintels finished off using a highly professional technique hints to a usage as an imperial or burial chapel. Pilgrims traversing Anatolia on the way to Jerusalem along an ancient route could readily reach the church.

Gertrude Bell (1868–1926), the British archaeologist and writer, photographed and measured Kızıl Kilise in 1907.

Reconstruction activities

In 2011 a program of reconstruction work began at the church. International fundraising raised 500,000 to finance the work. İsmet Ağaryılmaz, a retired professor who previously taught restoration techniques at Yıldız Technical University, directed the project.

Gallery

References

Byzantine churches in Cappadocia
Destroyed churches in Turkey
History of Aksaray Province
Buildings and structures in Aksaray Province
Historic sites in Turkey
Tourist attractions in Aksaray Province
6th-century churches